Kurt Charles Keeler (born July 26, 1959) is an American football coach and former player. He is the head football coach at Sam Houston State University, a position he had held since 2014. Previously, Keeler was the head coach at his alma mater, the University of Delaware, from 2002 to 2012, and at Rowan University from 1993 to 2001. 

Keeler is the all-time winningest coach in NCAA Division I Football Championship Subdivision playoff history and, after winning the national championship with Delaware in 2003 and Sam Houston State in 2020, the only coach in FCS history to win a national championship at two different institutions. In 2019, an ESPN Blue Ribbon Panel selected Keeler as one of the 150 greatest coaches in college football history.

Playing career

High school and college
Keeler played high school football at Emmaus High School in Emmaus, Pennsylvania. He was chosen to play in the 1977 Pennsylvania Big 33 All-Star game. He went on to play collegiate football at the University of Delaware, where he was a linebacker from 1978 to 1980 under coach Tubby Raymond. He was a member of the 1979 Division II National Championship squad.

NFL and USFL
In 1982, Keeler signed a free agent contract with the Philadelphia Eagles of the National Football League. Keeler was resigned by the Eagles in 1983 after being a late cut by the Philadelphia Stars of the USFL. He was one of the last players cut by the Eagles in both 1982 and 1983. Keeler was also a member of the 1984 Jacksonville Bulls of the United States Football League during their training camp.

Coaching career

Amherst and Rowan
Keeler began his coaching career as an assistant at Amherst College in Amherst, Massachusetts in 1981 and then at Rowan University in Glassboro, New Jersey in 1986. He became Rowan's head coach in the 1993 season, ending his tenure in 2001 with an 88–21–1 (.804) record and seven NCAA Division III playoff appearances. He was, however, 0–5 in NCAA Division III Football Championship Stagg Bowls at Rowan, losing by an average of 42.4 to 18.4.

Delaware
After Raymond retired in 2002, Keeler was named the fourth Delaware Fightin' Blue Hens football coach in 62 years. He immediately brought a new offensive philosophy to the team, replacing its famed and historic Winged-T formation with a no-huddle, spread offense. Under Keeler, Delaware won its first national championship since 1979 and its first-ever Division I-AA title (in 2003) with a 15–1 record and a 149–23 total score in the four-game playoff series.

Like his predecessor, Keeler became a popular figure in Delaware.  He was named "Delawarean of the Year" in 2004 by Delaware Today magazine and was listed as one of the top college football recruiters in the nation by American Football Monthly magazine. The Wilmington News Journal reported that Keeler was forced to hire an agent after the 2003 championship to help manage speaking engagements, guest appearances and private functions. His trademark sunglasses (which he also wore during night games) and wireless headgear were emulated on bobbleheads sold at games and local Newark, Delaware businesses.

Keeler often challenged criticism that I-AA/FCS programs are of lesser caliber than I-A. "We're the LSU; we're the Georgia, the Florida of Division I-AA," Keeler said in a 2004 interview with American Football Monthly. "We have every resource. There's some people who have better resources than we do, but in general, the college campus we have is in one of the greatest college towns in America, and the academics ... we led the nation last year in out-of-state applications, more than Michigan or Texas. But that's what this school has become. Everybody wants to come to school here."

On June 19, 2008, Keeler signed a 10-year contract extension, which would have seen him coach the Blue Hens through the 2017 season. However, Keeler was fired following a disappointing 2012 season, in which his team went 5-6.

Sam Houston
On January 23, 2014, Keeler was named the 15th head coach in Sam Houston State program history. In 2014, Sam Houston State went 11-5, as Keeler helped the Bearkats return to the FCS playoffs. Keeler's team won three playoff games, including a win over his old CAA rival Villanova, before losing in the semifinals. The Bearkats went 8-3 in 2015 and once again advanced to the playoff semifinals. 

In 2016, Keeler led Sam Houston State to their first undefeated regular season since 2011. Led by Walter Payton Award winner Jeremiah Briscoe, Sam Houston State won the Southland Conference and made an FCS playoffs run before being blown out by James Madison in the quarterfinals. Keeler was named Coach of the Year. 

In 2017, Keeler led Sam Houston State to the playoffs for the fourth straight year, once again advancing to the semifinals. This was his third appearance in the semifinals with Sam Houston, although he was once again stopped before the title game, losing to North Dakota State.

Keeler led the 2020 Bearkats to a 10–0 season, culminating with a 23–21 win over the South Dakota State Jackrabbits in the 2021 NCAA Division I Football Championship Game. It was the first NCAA football championship in program history; the Bearkats had shared the 1964 NAIA football championship with Concordia College of Moorhead, Minnesota.

As of 2022, Keeler has three Southland Conference championships, a WAC championship, 14 FCS playoff wins and a national title through eight seasons at Sam Houston. As a Bearkat, Keeler has become both the all time FCS playoffs wins leader and the only coach to win an FCS title with two different schools.

Commentating career
While out of coaching in 2013, Keeler worked as a content producer for NFL Films' NFL Matchup (featuring Ron Jaworski, Merril Hoge, and Sal Paolantonio, and  produced by Greg Cosell) and as a color commentator for ESPN.

Head coaching record

See also
 List of college football coaches with 200 wins
 List of college football coaches with 150 NCAA Division I FCS wins

References

External links
 Sam Houston profile

1959 births
Living people
American football linebackers
Amherst Mammoths football coaches
Delaware Fightin' Blue Hens football coaches
Delaware Fightin' Blue Hens football players
Rowan Profs football coaches
Sam Houston Bearkats football coaches
Emmaus High School alumni
Rowan University alumni 
Coaches of American football from Pennsylvania
Players of American football from Pennsylvania
Sportspeople from Lehigh County, Pennsylvania